is a Japanese musician and actor affiliated with Yoshimoto Kogyo. Yonehara debuted in 2001 as a member of the boy band and acting troupe Run&Gun. From 2010 to 2012, he was also the drummer of the band Cocoa Otoko. Later, he provided vocals and guitar to the musical duo Yosuke Kosuke with Yosuke Sakanoue.

As an actor, Yonehara has appeared in stage productions such as Air Gear, Fruits Basket, and Peacemaker Kurogane. He also starred in the film No Touching At All.

Career
Yonehara was a former trainee at Johnny & Associates as a Kansai Johnny's Jr., but he left and joined D.A.N.K. (Daisuke Asakura New Kids) in 2000, a performance troupe produced by Daisuke Asakura. In 2001, he appeared on the audition program Study Park!!, where he was selected as one of the members for the boy band Run&Gun, later debuting on July 4, 2001 with the single "Lay-Up!" During his time with the group, in 2005, Yonehara also released a solo song titled "Memories" for Run&Gun's first extended play, Hateshinai Tabi no Naka de...

As an actor, Yonehara appeared in the stage adaptation of Air Gear as Hamlet, but in the second installment he took over the role of Romeo from Ryuji Kamiyama after he had replaced Kenta Kamakari (who had fallen ill) as Minami Itsuki. He also played the female role of Rosemary in several Maria Magdalena stages. Between April 2010 and March 2012, he was the drummer of the rock group Cocoa Otoko.

Filmography

Television 
 Suiyō Premier (2004, TBS) 
 Busu no Hitomi ni Koishiteru (2006, Fuji TV) as Kōsuke Yoshida
 Helen to Kiyoshi no Monogatari (2006, Nippon TV) as Tanaka
 Yama Onna Kabe Onna (2007, Fuji TV) as Gōro Morita
 Heaven's Rock (2010, Kansai TV) as Yūsaku
 Yamikin Ushijima-kun (2010, Mainichi Hōsō) as Suguru
 Minami no Teiō (2013, Kansai TV) as Hasegawa
 Suiyō Mystery 9 (2013–14, TV Tokyo) as Taku Kaji
 BL Mangaka desu, Kedo Kekkon Shite mo Idesu ka? (2017, Fuji TV) 
 Club Slazy Extra invitation: Malachite (2017–18, Tokyo MX)
 Saigo no Ban Gohan (2018, BS TV Tokyo) as Riei Satonaka

Movies 
 Route58 (2003) as Takashi Chinen
 Yoshimoto Director's 100: 100-Ri ga Eiga Torimashita (2007)
 Zenzen Daijōbu (2008) 
 Detroit Metal City (2008) 
 Wangan Midnight (2009) as Masaki Takahashi
 The Hero Show (2010) as Tsutomu Kagawa
 Nobō no Shiro (2012) as Gonhei
 R-18 Bungaku-shō vol. 1 Jijōjibaku no Watashi (2013) as Tatsuya Sakurai
 No Touching At All (2014) as Toshiaki Shima
 Gachiban Series: New Generatin (2015)  
 Jinrō Shokei Game (2015) as Yūichi Niina
 Killing Curriculum: Jinrō Shokei Game - Prologue (2015) as Yūichi Niina

Stage
 Act of Date (2004)
 Prisoner#5 (2004)
 Run&Gun -restructuring- theater odyssey 05-06 The Entertainment for Adult (2005)
 Osaka Heaven (2006)
 Air Gear (2007) as Hamlet
 Musical Air Gear vs. Bacchus Super Range Remix (2007) as Romeo
 Run&Gun Stage: Blue Sheets (2008) as Masaru
 Run&Gun Stage: Yoosoro (2008) as Daisaku
 Maria Magdalena ~Lady Maria's Mad (Apple) Tea Party~ (2008) as Rosemary
 Dust (2009)
 Fruits Basket (2009) as Kagura Souma
 Peacemaker Kurogane (2009)
 Fake Heart (2009)
 My sweetheart is invisible (2009)
 Thanks! Grasshopper (2009)
 Run&Gun Stage: How many times can we save the world? (2010)
 Musical Air Gear vs. Bacchus Top Gear Remix (2010) as Hamlet
 Maria Magdalena ~Lady Maria's Dream is to open at night! House Magdara finally opened (2010) as Rosemary
 The Run&Gun Horror Show "Bacchus' Banquet (2011)
 Maria Magdalena ~Lady Maria's Mad (Apple) Tea Party (Reprise!)~ (2011) as Rosemary
 Men-tertainment (2011)
 Maria Magdalena ~House Magdara and much ado about nothing~ (2011) as Rosemary
 Bacchus' Holy Night (2011)
 Action Vol.3 (2012)
 The Little Mermaid (2012)
 Men-tertainment 2012 Special Live (2012)
 Maria Magdalena Magdara Live! (2012, SHIBUYA-AX) as Rosemary
 People who dose not fit is floating (2012)
 Mash Up! vol.3 (2012) 
 Corpus Christi (2012)
 Partner of Tail (2012)
 Tropical Boy (2012)
 BOYing!! (2012)
 BOYS★TALK (2013, Space Zero) as Sou
 Maria Magdalena (2013, Shibuya-Ax)
 Santa Claus Con-Game"~Side Story of Butas' Big Adventure~ (2013, Ikebukuro OwlSpotO)
 Club Slazy (2013, Shinjuku FACE) como Coolbeans
 Club Slazy The 2nd invitation ~Sapphire~ (2013, Space Zero) as Coolbeans
 Dawn Romantic" (2013, Kichijoji Theater)
 Luv Slazy (2014)
 Mom and us ~Babys don't want to study~ (2014, AiiA Theater Tokyo)
 Comic Potential (2014, Akasaka Red Theater)
 The Kaidan A thousand feet up the Alps Final (2014, Theater Sun Mall)
 Club Slazy The 3rd invitation ~Onyx~ (2014, Sogetsu Hall) as Coolbeans
 Aka to kuro (2014, Ichijoji Theater) 
 The Little Mermaid (2014, Sotetsu Honda Gekijo) as Depushi
 Boys★Talk (2014, Shinjuku Face)
 Vivid Contact -The just- (2015, Nakano The Pocket)
 Rainbow of Agartha (2015, Nakano Kinkero Theater)
 Mom and us ~Babys don't want to study~ (2015, AiiA Theater Tokyo)
 Handsome Rakugo 5th (2015, Tokyo CBGK!!)
 Tama and Friends (2015, Space Zero)
 I will tell you the reason of why man cry "4649" (2015, Theatre Bonbon)
 Takiguchi Flaming (2015, Meijiza)
 Handsome Rakugo 6th (2015, Tokyo CBGK!!)
 Tanabata Junction (2015, Hakuhinkan) as Tsutaya Jyusaburou
 WATARoom Summer Festival (2015, Nakano Theater Bonbon)
 Flower of Agartha (2015, Theater Haiyuza)
 Hell Screen (2015)
 Jinrou TLPT x Psycho-Pass: Innocent Murderer (2015, Theater Sun Mall)
 New Interpretation of Sanada Ten Braves (2015, Space Zero)  
 Club Slazy The 4th invitation ~Topaz~ (2015) as Coolbeans
 Vivid Contact -re:born- (2016, Nakano The Pocket) 
 Show By Rock!!　Musical (2016, Zepp Blue Theater Roppongi)
 Kanata Next" (2016, Last Waltz)
 I Am a Cat (2016, Theater Nihonbasi)
 Cherry Boys (2016, Hakuhinkan)
 Devils and Realist (2016, Space Zero) as Camio
 Public∴Garden! "Hush By" (2016)
 Tanabata Junction ~Syowa ~ A Game and a gentail lie (2016, Hakuhinkan) as Tsutaya Jyusaburou
 King Lear (2016) as Fool / Cordelia

Publications
 Flying Mellon (2007) Co-author: Ryuji Kamiyama
 Team! Danshi o Katarou Asamade! (2008), Ohta Publishing
 Hataraku Men's Shashin-shū Work-ish (2008), Gentosha
 Konya Uokka ga Shitataru Nikutai (2009), Kodansha
 Heaven's Rock (2010), Gakken Plus

References

External links 
 Official blog
 Run&Gun.jp - Official website 

1986 births
Living people
Musicians from Osaka
21st-century Japanese singers
21st-century Japanese male singers